Basmla Abdelhamid Abdelhamid Elsalamoney   بسملة عبد الحميد عبدالحميد السلاموني (born 25, February, 1999) at Gharbia, Egypt is an Egyptian triathlete.
Basmla is the first ever Egyptian to qualify to the Olympics triathlon, and the first Arab female triathlete to do so. While she took part in Tokyo 2020, also she was the youngest competitor at Triathlon at the 2020 Summer Olympics.

She represented Egypt at the 2019 African Games held in Rabat, Morocco and she won the women's triathlon event. She also won the bronze medal in the mixed relay event.

Career

References

External links 
 

Living people
1999 births
People from Gharbia Governorate
Egyptian female triathletes
African Games gold medalists for Egypt
African Games medalists in triathlon
Competitors at the 2019 African Games
Triathletes at the 2020 Summer Olympics
Olympic triathletes of Egypt
20th-century Egyptian women
21st-century Egyptian women